The Trans-European Division (TED) of Seventh-day Adventists is a sub-entity of the General Conference of Seventh-day Adventists, which coordinates the Church's operations in 22 European countries: Albania, Bosnia-Herzegovina, the Channel Islands, Croatia, Cyprus, Denmark, Estonia, the Faeroe Islands, Finland, Greece, Greenland, Hungary, Iceland, Ireland, the Isle of Man, Latvia, Lithuania, Macedonia, Montenegro, the Netherlands, Norway, Poland, Serbia, Slovenia, Sweden, and the United Kingdom. Its headquarters is in St Albans in the United Kingdom. Founded in 1928, the division membership as of June 30, 2021 is 88,273.

Sub Fields

The Trans-European Division is divided into seven Union Conferences, four Union of Churches Conferences, one attached Conference, one attached Mission and one attached Section.  These are divided into local Conferences, Missions, Fields & one Section.

 Adriatic Union Conference 
 Croatian Conference 
 Slovenian Conference 
 Albanian Mission
 Baltic Union Conference 
 Estonian Conference 
 Latvian Conference 
 Lithuanian Conference 
 British Union Conference 
 South England Conference 
 North England Conference 
 Irish Mission 
 Scottish Mission 
 Welsh Mission 
 Danish Union of Churches Conference 
 Finland Union of Churches Conference 
 Hungarian Union Conference 
 Duna Conference 
 Tisza Conference 
 Netherlands Union of Churches Conference 
 Norwegian Union Conference 
 East Norway Conference 
 North Norway Conference 
 West Norway Conference
 Polish Union Conference 
 East Polish Conference 
 South Polish Conference 
 West Polish Conference 
 South-East European Union Conference 
Bosnia and Herzegovina Conference 
 North Conference 
 South Conference  
 Macedonian Mission 
 Swedish Union of Churches 
 Cyprus Section 
 Greek Mission 
Iceland Conference

History

See also
Seventh-day Adventist Church
List of Seventh-day Adventist hospitals
List of Seventh-day Adventist secondary schools
List of Seventh-day Adventist colleges and universities

References

External links

Adventist organizations established in the 20th century
Organisations based in Hertfordshire
Seventh-day Adventist Church in Europe